Wulfhilde Billung of Saxony (1072 – 29 December 1126) was the eldest daughter of Magnus, Duke of Saxony and his wife, Sophia of Hungary.

She married Duke Henry IX of Bavaria.  As a result of this marriage, part of the Billung possessions came into the hands of the House of Guelph.  They had the following children:
 Henry X
 Conrad (died: 17 March 1126 in Bari, buried in Molfetta), a Cistercian monk and saint
 Sophia
 Judith
 Matilda (d. 1138), married Margrave Diephold IV of Vohburg (d. 1130) and Count Gebhard III of Sulzbach (d. 1188)
 Welf VI
 Wulfhilde, married Rudolf I, Count of Bregenz (d. 1160)

Wulfhilde died in 1126 and was buried at Weingarten Abbey.

References

Sources

1072 births
1126 deaths
House of Billung
Duchesses of Bavaria
11th-century Saxon people
12th-century Saxon people
Burials at Weingarten Abbey
11th-century German women
12th-century German women
Daughters of monarchs